Üüreg Lake (Üüreg nuur) is a saline lake in an endorheic basin in western Mongolia, north-west of the Great Lakes Hollow, near the western edge of the Uvs Nuur basin. The Tsagaan river gorge (Tsagaan Shuvuut Uul) lies on the west side of the lake.

Geography 
The shores of the lake are slightly sloping and smooth, without bays or peninsulas. Several rivers flow into the lake, but most are intermittent. The largest river with a constant flow is the Khari River, which flows into the northwest of the lake. Swamp-type shrubs and swamps grow near the mouth of the Khari River. The lake water is salty due to high evaporation and no outflow.

The Üüreg Lake depression is a desert, so there is a lot of evaporation from the water surface. The average annual evaporation is 800-900 mm. In addition to the inflow of rivers, this water loss is offset by rainfall and groundwater. The general salinity of the water is 4.17 g/L.

Flora and fauna 

Khankhukhii Mountain, Tokhtoshin-Shil Mountains, Kharkhiraa Turgen mountains, Ulias glass forest, high mountain, rock argali, ram, deer, antelope, leopard, lynx, ibex, marten, pig, wolf, roe deer, wolf, fox, squirrel, ptarmigan, rain, Siberian capercaillie, partridge, hazel grouse, mountain hare, Siberian chipmunk, corsac fox, manul, badger, stinking brown , artichoke, rabbit, marmot, squirrel, rainbow partridge , Mongolian five-toed jerboa, desman, Mongolian ground jay, bozlog and other animals and plants.

The lake is home to various birds such as waterfowls (swans, geese, ducks), peacocks, pelicans, and others. The lake has fish, including Mongolian grayling (Thymallus brevirostris) and Altai carp.

References

Lakes of Mongolia
Endorheic lakes of Asia
Uvs Province
Saline lakes of Asia